The Heusweiler transmitter  is a facility for medium wave broadcasting near Heusweiler, Germany, which originally went into service on 23 December 1935. On 19 June 1946 transmitter Heusweiler went in service again.

Original transmitter 
It used a t-aerial, which was up-hung on two 35 and 31 meters tall wooden towers. The Heusweiler transmitter was destroyed on March 17, 1945 by war damage.

First a t-aerial was used, which was, in the same year, replaced by a 50 metre tall steel framework mast insulated against ground, which exists still today and serves as reserve antenna.

Replacement transmitters 
In 1948, a 120 meter high steel framework mast insulated from ground was built in Heusweiler. In the following years, the transmitting power of the Heusweiler transmitter was steadily increased.

In 1965, another radio mast with a height of 120 meters was built, and in 1973 the transmitting power was increased to 1200 kilowatts, with the power reduced to 600 kilowatts at night. The Heusweiler transmitter  was thereby the most powerful medium wave transmitter in Germany, and the most powerful transmitter of the ARD.

From 1973 to 1994 the Heusweiler transmitter transmitted the program of Europawelle Saar.

Current transmitter 
Since 1994, the transmitter has been used for broadcasting the program of Deutschlandfunk. The transmitting power is permanently 600 kilowatts, however Deutschlandfunk closed down all its Medium Wave transmitters, including the Heusweiler radio transmitter on December 31, 2015.

In order to prevent a disturbing influence on car electronics by the transmitter, a net of wires was hung over the A8 Autobahn near the transmitter.

The Saarland Broadcasting plans to put a second medium-wave transmitter in Heusweiler in service for an information program in the day hours.

External links
 http://www.algewe.de/Seite41.htm
 
 http://skyscraperpage.com/diagrams/?b60842
 http://skyscraperpage.com/diagrams/?b60843
 http://skyscraperpage.com/diagrams/?b45681
 http://skyscraperpage.com/diagrams/?b45682
 http://skyscraperpage.com/diagrams/?b46638
 https://maps.google.com/maps?ie=UTF8&z=18&ll=49.345051,6.914992&spn=0.001391,0.003616&t=h&om=1

References

Former radio masts and towers
Radio masts and towers in Germany
Saarbrücken (district)
1935 establishments in Germany
Towers completed in 1935